"Light Up (The World)" is a song recorded by British artist Yasmin, featuring Shy FX and Ms. Dynamite. The song was released on 15 January 2012 for digital download in the United Kingdom as Yasmin's third single.

Music video
A music video to accompany the release of "Light Up (The World)" was first released onto YouTube on 11 November 2011 at a total length of three minutes and thirty-six seconds. The video was filmed in Cuba, and also features Ms Dynamite.

Live performances
She first premiered the song at The Wickerman Festival in Scotland on July 22, 2011.

Track listing

Chart performance

Release history

References

External links

2012 singles
Yasmin (musician) songs
Ms. Dynamite songs
Shy FX songs
Ministry of Sound singles
Breakbeat songs
Reggae fusion songs
Songs written by Ms. Dynamite
2011 songs